Ischiopsopha wallacei yorkiana are beetles in Australia from the family Scarabaeidae, subfamily Cetoniinae, tribe Schizorhinini. It is a sub-species of Ischiopsopha wallacei.
The Cetoniinae scarabs are known as "flower chafers" as their main food is pollen and nectar sourced from flowers.

Description
Ischiopsopha wallacei can reach a length of about 30 mm. The beetles are an electric green colour, and have the tip of the scutellum visible.

Distribution
This species inhabits the Cape York Peninsula region of Australia.

References

Cetoniinae
Beetles described in 1877